Simon Louvish (born 6 April 1947, Glasgow, Scotland) is a Scots-born Israeli author, writer and filmmaker. He has written many books about Avram Blok, a fictional Israeli caught up between wars, espionage, prophets, revolutions, loves, and a few near apocalypses.

Louvish is a visiting lecturer in Screen Studies at the London Film School. He has written books on W. C. Fields, The Marx Brothers, Groucho Marx, Laurel and Hardy, Mae West, Cecil B. DeMille, Mack Sennett and Charlie Chaplin.

Publications 
 The Avram Blok Saga
 
 
 
 
 
 
 Fiction
 
 
 
 
 
 
 
 
 Non-fiction
 
 
 
 
 
 
 
  
Also published (2008) as Cecil B. DeMille: A Life in Art

References

External links

His homepage
New York Times a review of Cecil B. DeMille: A Life in Art
Macmillan Publishers a photograph of Louvish

1947 births
Living people
Israeli film producers
Israeli novelists
Israeli biographers
Writers from Glasgow
Scottish Jews
British emigrants to Israel